Juan de la Calle y Heredia (1612 – 15 Feb 1676) was a Roman Catholic prelate who served as Bishop of Arequipa (1674–1676), Bishop of Trujillo (1661–1674).

Biography
Juan de la Calle y Heredia was born in Granada, Spain in 1612 and ordained a friar in the Order of Our Lady of Mercy. On 5 Sep 1661, he was appointed during the papacy of Pope Alexander VII as Bishop of Trujillo. On 22 Oct 1662, he was consecrated bishop by Pedro de Villagómez Vivanco, Archbishop of Lima. On 1 Oct 1674, he was appointed during the papacy of Pope Clement X as Bishop of Arequipa. He served as Bishop of Arequipa until his death on 15 Feb 1676.

References

External links and additional sources
 (for Chronology of Bishops) 
 (for Chronology of Bishops) 

17th-century Roman Catholic bishops in Peru
Bishops appointed by Pope Alexander VII
Bishops appointed by Pope Clement X
1612 births
1676 deaths
People from Granada
Mercedarian bishops
Roman Catholic bishops of Arequipa
Roman Catholic bishops of Trujillo